Ma Chun-ping (born 3 August 1971) is a Taiwanese athlete. She competed in the women's heptathlon at the 1992 Summer Olympics.

References

1971 births
Living people
Athletes (track and field) at the 1992 Summer Olympics
Taiwanese heptathletes
Olympic athletes of Taiwan
Place of birth missing (living people)
Asian Games medalists in athletics (track and field)
Asian Games bronze medalists for Chinese Taipei
Athletes (track and field) at the 1990 Asian Games
Athletes (track and field) at the 1994 Asian Games
Athletes (track and field) at the 1998 Asian Games
Medalists at the 1990 Asian Games
Medalists at the 1994 Asian Games
Medalists at the 1998 Asian Games
20th-century Taiwanese women